is a professional Japanese darts player who plays in the Professional Darts Corporation events.

Career
He first came to prominence in 2015, when he was one of 8 Japanese qualifiers who played in the 2015 Japan Darts Masters, where he lost 6–2 to Gary Anderson, although he hit a 121 checkout, one of the highest in the tournament.

He then represented Japan alongside Haruki Muramatsu in the 2017 PDC World Cup of Darts, where they let a 3–1 lead slip into a 5–3 defeat against the Spanish duo of Cristo Reyes and Toni Alcinas.

His big breakthrough came in 2019, where he won a PDC Asian Tour event in Hong Kong, defeating Paul Lim in the final. He finished 5th in the Asian Tour standings, but thanks to Seigo Asada winning the PDJ Championships, he qualified for the 2020 PDC World Darts Championship.

World Championship results

PDC
 2020: Second round (lost to Darren Webster 0–3)
 2022: First round (lost to Callan Rydz 0–3)

References

External links

1983 births
Living people
Japanese darts players
Professional Darts Corporation associate players
PDC World Cup of Darts Japanese team